Elizabeth the Queen Mother (1900–2002) was the consort of George VI and mother of Elizabeth II.

Elizabeth the Queen Mother may also refer to:
 Elisabeth of Bavaria (1227–1273), consort of Conrad IV of Germany and mother of Conradin
 Elizabeth the Cuman (1244–1290), consort of Stephen V of Hungary and mother of Ladislaus IV of Hungary
 Elisabeth of Carinthia (1262–1312), consort of Albert I of Germany and mother of Rudolf I of Bohemia
 Elizabeth of Portugal (1271–1336), consort of Denis of Portugal and mother of Afonso IV of Portugal
 Elizabeth of Poland (1305–1380), consort of Charles I of Hungary and mother of Louis I of Hungary
 Elizabeth of Carinthia (1338–1355), consort of Peter II of Sicily and mother of Louis of Sicily
 Elizabeth of Bosnia (1339–1387), consort of Louis I of Hungary and mother of queens Mary of Hungary and Jadwiga of Poland
 Elizabeth of Pomerania (1347–1393), consort of Charles IV, Holy Roman Emperor and mother of Sigismund, Holy Roman Emperor
 Elisabeth of Bavaria-Ingolstadt (1370–1435), consort of Charles VI of France and mother of Charles VII of France
 Elizabeth of Luxembourg (1409–1442), consort of Albert II of Germany and mother of Ladislaus the Posthumous
 Elizabeth of Austria (1436–1505), consort of Casimir IV Jagiellon and mother of kings John I, Alexander and Sigismund I of Poland, and Louis II of Hungary and Bohemia
 Elizabeth Woodville (1437–1492), consort of Edward IV of England and mother of Edward V of England and Elizabeth of York
 Elisabeth Farnese (1692–1766), consort of Philip V of Spain and mother of Charles III of Spain
 Elisabeth of Bavaria (1876–1965), consort of Albert I of Belgium and mother of Leopold III of Belgium

See also 
 Queen Elizabeth (disambiguation)
 Queen-mother (disambiguation)